The following Union Army units and commanders fought in the Battle of Westport of the American Civil War. The Confederate order of battle is listed separately.

Command disputes
By order of MG Blunt (General Field Orders No. 2) the militia regiments of William H. M. Fishbeck, Brigadier General of Militia, were placed under the command of Charles W. Blair, Colonel of Volunteers; Fishbeck was infuriated that his command had been subordinated to a volunteer officer.  Because Kansas law stated that militia should be kept under the command of militia officers, Fishbeck disregarded Blunt's order.  Blunt had Fishbeck arrested and held until released by order of MG Curtis.  Upon his release, Fishbeck resumed command of the Kansas Militia regiments, with orders to obey directives that came from MG Blunt.  This rather cumbersome arrangement had BG Fishbeck in direct command of the militia units attached to the 3rd Brigade, 1st Division, and Col Charles Blair in overall command of the brigade.  Howard N. Monnett describes the arrangement as a "brigade within a brigade".  Blair and Fishbeck led the militia into action at Westport (accompanied onto the field by MG George W. Dietzler), and then in the subsequent pursuit of Price until MG Curtis ordered the militia to return home.

Abbreviations used

Military rank
 MG = Major General
 BG = Brigadier General
 Col = Colonel
 Ltc = Lieutenant Colonel
 Maj = Major
 Cpt = Captain
 Lt = 1st Lieutenant
 2Lt = 2nd Lieutenant

Other
 w = wounded

Army of the Border

MG Samuel R. Curtis
Escort:
 11th Kansas Cavalry, Company G (with 2-gun battery): Lt Edward Gill

Department of the Missouri
MG William S. Rosecrans

XVI Corps

(detachment of First and Third Divisions; in pursuit, not present at the battle)
MG Andrew Jackson Smith

Notes

References
 Eicher, John H., and Eicher, David J., Civil War High Commands, Stanford University Press, 2001, 
 Jenkins, Paul B.  The Battle of Westport (Kansas City, MO:  Franklin Hudson Publishing Co.), 1906.
 Monnett, Howard N. Action Before Westport: 1864 (Niwot, CO:  University Press of Colorado), 1995. [revised edition]

American Civil War orders of battle